Ken Harvey may refer to:
Ken Harvey (baseball) (born 1978), baseball player
Ken Harvey (American football) (born 1965), former NFL linebacker
Ken Harvey (professor), Australian professor at Bond University and critic of pharmaceutical marketing and complementary medicines

See also
Kenneth J. Harvey (born 1962), Canadian writer